Şırnak University (Turkish: Şırnak Üniversitesi) is a university located in Şırnak, Turkey. It was established in 2008.

References

External links
Official Website

Universities and colleges in Turkey
Educational institutions established in 2008
State universities and colleges in Turkey
2008 establishments in Turkey
Şırnak